Arthrosaura kockii is a species of lizard in the family Gymnophthalmidae. It is found in  Suriname, French Guiana, and Brazil.

References

Arthrosaura
Reptiles described in 1904
Taxa named by Theodorus Willem van Lidth de Jeude